Expressway 35 may refer to the following roads in South Korea:

 Tongyeong–Daejeon Expressway : Tongyeong, South Gyeongsang ~ Dong District, Daejeon
 Jungbu Expressway : Cheongju, North Chungcheong ~ Hanam, Gyeonggi